Luigi Pulini was an Italian painter, mainly of landscapes.

He was born in Sicily, and became a resident of Rome where he completed his studies. At Rome, in 1883, he exhibited two canvases depicting : Lave sull'Etna and Il Tevere presso Porta del Popolo a Rome. In the 1884 Esposizione Nazionale of Turin, he exhibited: Prime viole; Strada in Ciociaria (Turin Exhibition, 1884), and other studies . He often exhibited landscapes of Catania, such as A Morning in Sicily, Lave dell'Etna, and Acicastello presso Catania.

References

Painters from Sicily
19th-century Italian painters
Italian male painters
Italian landscape painters
19th-century Italian male artists